The Sleeping Prince is a Greek fairy tale collected by  in Folktales of Greece.

It is Aarne-Thompson 425G:  False Bride takes the heroine's place as she tries to stay awake; recognition when heroine tells her story.  This is also found as part of Nourie Hadig, and a literary variant forms part of the frame story of the Pentamerone.

The tale type was also closely related to AaTh 437, "The Supplanted Bride (The Needle Prince)". However, the last major revision of the International Folktale Classification Index, written in 2004 by German folklorist Hans-Jörg Uther, reclassified the tale type as ATU 894, "".

Synopsis

A king had only his daughter, his wife having died, and had to go to war.  The princess promised to stay with her nurse while he was gone.  One day, an eagle came by and said she would have a dead man for a husband; it came again the next day.  She told her nurse, and her nurse told her to tell the eagle to take her to him.  The third day, it came, and she asked; it brought her to a palace, where a prince slept like the dead, and a paper said that whoever had pity on him must watch for three months, three weeks, three days, three hours, and three half-hours without sleeping, and then, when he sneezed, she must bless him and identify herself as the one who watched.  He and the whole castle would wake, and he would marry the woman.

She watched three months, three weeks, and three days.  Then she heard someone offering to hire maids.  She hired one for company.  The maid persuaded her to sleep, the prince sneezed, and the maid claimed him.  She told him to let the princess sleep and when she woke, set to tend the geese.  (The fairy tale starts to refer to the prince as the king.)

The king had to go to war.  He asked the queen what she wanted, and she asked for a golden crown.  He asked the goose-girl, and she asked for the millstone of patiences, the hangman's rope, and the butcher's knife, and if he did not bring them, his ship would go neither backward nor forward.  He forgot them, and his ship would not move; an old man asked him if he had promised anything, so he bought them.  He gave his wife the crown and the other things to the goose-girl.  That evening, he went down to her room.  She told her story to the things and asked them what she should do.  The butcher's knife said to stab herself; the rope, to hang herself; the millstone, to have patience.  She asked for the rope again and went to hang herself.  The king broke in and saved her.  He declared she was his wife and he would hang the other on the rope.  She told him only to send her away.  They went to her father for his blessing.

Analysis
Richard MacGillivray Dawkins described that the "essence" of the tale type involves the heroine being destined to marry "a dead man", which is not dead at all. The prince, in fact, is under a magical sleep in a room in a castle somewhere. The heroine finds him and stays by his side on a long vigil. The heroine hires a maid or slave to help her in the long vigil, but she replaces the heroine and takes credit for awakening the prince. At the end of the tale, the prince, now back to life, is asked by a broken heroine to bring her ("almost always") three objects: a knife, a rope to hang herself with and a stone of patience.

Variants
Greek scholars Anna Angelopoulou and Aigle Broskou locate variants of type AaTh 425G in Greece, Turkey, Southern Italy, Sicily, Spain, North Africa (among the Berbers) and even in Poland.

Israeli professor Dov Noy (de) reported that the tale type 894 was "very popular in Oriental literature", with variants found in India, Iran, Egypt and regionally in Europe (southern and eastern).

As for type 437, Richard Dorson stated that it appears "sporadically in Europe", but it is "better known in India". Indian scholar A. K. Ramanujan states that the tale type is known in Europe as "The Needle Prince".

Europe
Scholars Ibrahim Muhawi and Sharif Kanaana stated that "in European tradition" type AaTh 894 is found in association with the story of "The Sleeping Prince". Professor Jack V. Haney stated that type 437 is more common in Ukraine, but "uncommon" in Western Europe.

Italy
A Sicilian variant was collected by Laura Gonzenbach with the title Der böse Schulmeister und die wandernde Königstochter ("The Evil Schoolmaster and the Wandering Princess").

Greek
According to scholars Anna Angélopoulos and Marianthi Kaplanoglou, the tale type AaTh 425G (now included in the general subtype ATU 425A after 2004) is the "most widely disseminated subtype in Greece, with 118 versions".

In another Greek variant, The Knife of Slaughter, the Whet-stone of Patience and the Unmelting Candle, a girl is broidering when a bird chirps that she is to marry a "lifeless man". One day, she enters a neighbouring house and sees the body of a prince holding a letter in his hand, telling for someone to hold a vigil for three nights, three days and three weeks. Nearing the end of the vigil, she takes in a gypsy as a companion, who takes the credit for the vigil. After the prince and the gypsy marry, she asks the prince to bring her the titular items: the Knife of Slaughter, the Whet-stone of Patience and the Unmelting Candle.

Spain
Hispanist  located a Spanish tale he numbered as type *445B (a number not added to the revision of the international index, at the time). In this story, the princess holds a vigil on a king that will only awake on St. John's Day. She buys a slave woman for company, who takes her place at the king's bed and passes herself as his saviour. The despondent princess asks the prince to bring her two objects: a hard stone and the branch of bitterness. The king learns these are objects requested by people who are on the verge on taking their own lives. Scholars Wolfram Eberhard and Pertev Naili Boratav considered this story so close to the Turkish tales that they believed it to be a version that developed locally.

Armenia
According to Armenian scholarship, Armenia also registers similar tales about the heroine's confession to the object of patience. In Armenian tales, the object is called Sabri Xrcig or Doll of Patience, related to the cycle of stories called Le Prince endormi ("The Sleeping Prince").

Professor Susan Hoogasian-Villa collected two variants from Armenian tellers in Detroit. In the first, titled Saber Dashee, during a pilgrimage to Jerusalem, a girl loses her way from her family and enters an abandoned house. Inside, a man under a cursed sleep, on whom she has to bear ten years on a vigil. She gets replaced by a gypsy girl, who marries the prince after the vigil. The heroine asks for the Saber Dashee and pours out her story to it. In a second story, The Dead Bridegroom, the trees and the river predict that a girl will marry a dead man. The girl enters a palace that locks behind her, then sees a man in a cursed-like sleep. Hoogasian-Villa noted that it follows very closely the outline of the first variant.

Albania
In an Albanian tale published by Lucy Garnett with the title The Maiden who was Promised to the Sun, a queen prays to the Sun to give her one daughter, and the Sun agrees, with the condition that she relinquishes the girl to him when she is of age. It does happen and the girl is taken to the Sun. At the Sun's abode, there lives a Koutchedra (kulshedra) that hungers to devour the maiden. She escapes with the help of a stag and returns home (tale type ATU 898, "The Girl Promised to the Sun"). In the second part of the story, the girl enters a garden and opens a locked gate that closes itself behind her. She discovers the petrified body of a prince and she decides to release him from this curse, by holding a vigil for three days, three nights and three weeks without sleeping. Nearing the end of the trial, and feing tired, she hires a slave woman to continue the vigil in her place, when the girl with reassume her position by the prince's side. The slave woman ends up replacing the princess as the man's saviour and marries him. The girl laments her fate to the "Stone of Patience" and the prince overhears her story.

Lithuania
Lithuanian folklorist , in his analysis of Lithuanian folktales (published in 1936), listed one variant of type *446 (a type not indexed in the international classification, at the time), under the banner Miegas karalaitis ("The Sleeping Prince"). In the only recorded tale, the princess finds the coffin of the sleeping prince and a note to hold a vigil for three nights.

Latvia
According to the Latvian Folktale Catalogue, in type 437, Neīstā līgava ("The False Bride"), the heroine helps break the curse on the whole kingdom, until a girl comes and takes the credit for the deed. The true heroine asks the prince to bring her a stone or a doll, to which she tells her story.

Asia

Turkey
According to Dov Noy, the Turkish Folktale Catalogue (Typen türkischer Volksmärchen, or TTV) by Wolfram Eberhard and Pertev Naili Boratav registered 38 variants in the country. In their joint work, the Turkish tales were grouped under type TTV 185, .

In a Turkish variant collected by folklorist Ignác Kúnos with the title Stone-Patience and Knife-Patience, a poor woman's daughter stays at home when a bird chirps that "death" is her kismet ('fate', 'destiny'). The situation repeats itself, to the mother's concern. She decides to let her daughter walk a bit with the neighbour's daughters to put her mind at ease. When walking with the girls, a huge wall rises out of the ground to isolate the poor woman's daughter from the other, who return to the village to inform the old woman of the occurrence. Back to the girl: she finds a door on the wall, opens it and is transported to a grand palace. The girl opens all doors, filled with treasures and gems, and behind the fortieth door, lies a Bey on a bed holding a note that says a damsel must stay by his side for 40 days to find her kismet. So she decides to follow the note. Time passes, the girl meets a black woman outside of the palace and brings her in to help her vigil. The Bey awakes, sees the black girl and thinks she is his saviour. At the end of the tale, the girl asks the Bey to bring her a stone-of-patience of a yellow colour and a knife-of-patience with brown handle. She gets both items: she tells her woes to the stone, but chooses the knife. The Bey appears in the nick of time to stop her attempt.

Iran
German scholar  reported 22 variants of tale type 894, Der Geduldstein, across Iranian sources.

In a Persian tale collected by Emily Lorimer and David Lockhart Robertson Lorimer, from Kermani, The Story of the Marten-Stone, a king's daughter finds a castle with a sleeping prince inside, his body covered with needles. She begins a long and strenuous vigil, picking each needle for the next 40 days and 40 nights. After her slave girl replaces her as the prince's saviour, she asks for a marten-stone to pour out her woes to.

Uzbekistan
In an Uzbek tale titled "Горючий камень" ("The Burning Stone"), a girl named Rose Bloom is fetching flowers, when she follows a trail deep into a mansion. Inside it, there lies the body of a man, all riddled with pins. The girl extracts each pin carefully, until she begins to get tired. She hires a servant girl from a passing caravan to continue the vigil on him. The man wakes up and mistakes the servant girl for Rose Bloom. At the end of the tale, Rose Bloom asks the prince to get her a burning stone: she plans to tell her sorrows to the stone until it bursts into a pyre, and intends to throw herself into it.

India
Ramanujan states that the story is combined in India with a local version of the King Lear judgment, indexed as type AT 923B, "The Princess Who Was Responsible for Her Own Fortune".

In a tale from New Goa, collected in the Konkani language, The King of Pins, a princess gives alms to a beggar lady. In return, the lady prays that the maiden will marry the "King of Pins". Her interest piqued, the princess asks around the location of this prince. When she reaches her destination, she enters a fabulous palace and enter a room. Inside, there is a prince in a coma-like state, his body prickled by pins from head to toe. The princess then begins to take out the pins. Unfortunately, she falls asleep, and a "wicked black woman" appears to finish her job. When all pins are taken out of his body, he awakens and sees the black woman instead of princess, thinking her to be his saviour.

India-born author Maive Stokes collected and published the Indian tale The Princess who Loved her Father like Salt. In the first part of the tale, three princesses are asked a question about how much they love their father - akin to King Lear's judgment or tale type ATU 923, "Love Like Salt". After the princess is banished by her father to the jungle, she finds a palace deep within the jungle. Inside lies a prince in a deep sleep, his body prickled by needles. She begins the task of carefully taking each needle, one by one, until one day she purchases a slave girl to keep her company. Maive Stokes compared this tale to a Sicilian variant collected by folklorist Laura Gonzenbach, with the name Der böse Schulmeister und die wandernde Königstochter ("The Evil Schoolmaster and the Wandering Princess").

In a Central Indian tale collected from a Bharia in Mandla and titled The Sister, a princess with seven brothers receives a prophecy by an astrologer: she will marry a corpse. She and her brothers later find a house in the jungle. Inside, there lies the body of a man with innumerable pins on it. The princess holds a vigil on the man, is replaced by a slave and buys a doll to be her confidant.

Indian scholar A. K. Ramanujan collected a Kannada tale titled The Dead Prince and the Talking Doll. In this tale, the heroine (a king's daughter) is predicted by a beggar to have a dead man as husband. The king decides to avert this fate for his daughter and departs from the kingdom. Meanwhile, the story takes a turn to explain how a prince from a neighbouring kingdom fell deathly ill and seemed to die, so his father put his body in a bungalow outside his kingdom, only to be accessed by his destined bride. The action returns to the first king and his family: they pass by the bungalow and his daughter enters it, the door closing behind her. She discovers the body of the prince and holds a long, 12 year vigil on him. The girl longs for a female companion and an acrobat girl appears outside the bungalow. She contorts herself and enters the building. Some time later, a bird chirps outside that the time of the vigil is at an end and the girl should take the leaves from a certain tree, make a juice out of it and give it to the prince. The acrobat girl obeys the bird's instructions and passes herself off as the prince's saviour, making the princess her servant. Later, the princess asks the prince for a talking doll, to whom she tells her story, and the prince overhears it. Ramanujan cited it as an example of "woman-centered folktale".

See also
Pentamerone
The Lord of Lorn and the False Steward
The Goose Girl
The Young Slave
The Maiden with the Rose on her Forehead
The Bay-Tree Maiden
Sleeping Beauty

References

Further reading
 Cardigos, Isabel (2007). "Em Busca Do Belo Adormecido No Mundo Dos Contos Tradicionais". In: Povos E Culturas, n. 11 (Janeiro), 11-31. https://doi.org/10.34632/povoseculturas.2007.8780. (In Portuguese)
 "L'épingle qui endort". In: Cosquin, Emmanuel. Les Contes indiens et l'occident: petites monographies folkloriques à propos de contes Maures. Paris: Édouard Champion. 1922. pp. 95-190.
 Dawkins, R. M. (1949). "The Story of Griselda". In: Folklore, 60:4, pp. 363-374. DOI: 10.1080/0015587X.1949.9717955
 Goldberg, Christine. "The Knife of Death and the Stone of Patience". In: E.L.O.: Estudos de Literatura Oral. Spring 1995. pp. 103-117
 Katrinaki, Emmanouela. Le cannibalisme dans le conte merveilleux grec. Questions d’interprétation et de typologie. Helsinki: Academia Scientiarum Fennica. 2008. 
 Katrinaki, Emmanouela. "Le secret du maitre d'ecole. A propos du conte type ATU 894". In: Cahiers de litterature orale n. 57-58. 2005. pp. 139-164.

Sleeping Prince
Sleeping Prince
Sleep in mythology and folklore
ATU 400-459
ATU 850-999
False hero